A. vulgaris may refer to:
 Acetosella vulgaris, a species of flowering plant in the buckwheat family
 Alchemilla vulgaris, common lady's mantle, a herbaceous perennial plant in Europe and Greenland
 Aloe vulgaris, a succulent plant species of the genus Aloe
 Amelanchier vulgaris, commonly known as snowy mespilus, is serviceberry shrub
 Anguilla vulgaris, a species of eel, a snake-like, catadromous fish
 Apamea vulgaris, a moth of the family Noctuidae
 Aquilegia vulgaris, a flowering plant species
 Arcella vulgaris, a single-celled species
 Arion vulgaris or Spanish slug, a species of air-breathing land slug
 Armadillo vulgaris, a widespread European species of woodlouse
 Armeniaca vulgaris, the apricot tree, a tree species
 Artemisia vulgaris, a medicinal plant species
 Assiminea vulgaris, a gastropod mollusc species
 Austroicetes vulgaris, a grasshopper in the genus Austroicetes

See also
 Vulgaris (disambiguation)